Hui refers to a group-based rotating saving and credit scheme that is popular among many immigrant and migrant communities throughout the United States and in Taiwan. Biao Hui ( 'to bid in Hui') is the Chinese verb when someone is engaging or participating in Hui.

Process
The basic premise of the model is a group of close friends and family members coming together once a month and contributing a fixed amount of the money into a money pool. Every time, one member of the group will be chosen to withdraw the entire lump sum from the pool, often for purpose of down payments towards houses or cars or to start a new business. When the same group of people comes together again in the subsequent month contributing the same fixed amount, another member of the group will be chosen to take the lump sum. This process is repeated until every member in the group had a chance to withdraw the lump sum in a given month.

Initiation and role of the group leader
A particular Hui is usually initiated by a trusted figure/influencer within a community. This person is considered as the group leader and is in charge of recruiting and vetting all participating members. While other participants can also vouch for and extend the invitation to their friends and family members, their participation still requires approval of the group leader.

The group leader is usually held responsible for any frauds, embezzlement or defaults within the group, should anyone fail to follow through on their commitment. In this case, the group leader has to cover the losses with their own money to make all other group members whole.

Typically, group leaders will host all of group members at his/her residence to collect everyone's monthly contribution and facilitate any borrowing requests. To compensate for group leader's risk and hard work, he/she often has the priority in borrowing the money from the group on any given month when needed. In fact, this is one of the main reasons one become a group leader of a hui, to fulfill his/her upcoming financing needs.

Differences to other schemes
Unlike similar schemes in other cultures, where all the savings and borrowing among the group members are interest-free and the order of the withdraw are determined by the group leader, Hui adopts a market-driven interest rate approach: In any given month, all members currently interested in taking the money pot have to submit an interest amount they are willing to pay to the group. Typically the person who is ready to pay the highest interest will receive the pot, with the interest amount being evenly disbursed among the other group members. Typically, the interest payments are higher and more competitive during the early months of the Hui, and tend to decrease towards the end of the Hui.

Online model
Several companies have tried to adopt the Hui scheme to online platforms, some of the notable ones including Monk, Puddle, and LendingCircle.

See also
 Collaborative finance
 Mutualism
 Solidarity lending
 Susu_(informal_loan_club)

References

Microfinance in Asia
Informal economy in Asia
Rotating savings and credit association
 Finance in China the influencer is known as the banker in some Caribbean Island s e.g. Jamaica. There are often informal agreements among members to give the banker a "smalls" amount out of their draw as appreciation for the Banker's trouble of coordinating and collecting and paying over the "draw" to the member whose turn it is.